Cem Belevi (born 4 June 1973) is a Turkish pop music singer and actor. He is best known for collaborating with Ayshe on "Kim Ne Derse Desin".

He studied international business in Brunel University. His mother is a painter, and his father is a pianist.

Musical career 
He released his debut album Bilmezsin in 2013. "Günaydın Sevgilim" became the leading song and first video for the album. The album didn't get much attention, but the song gets affected by Turkish music executive Samsun Demir. The song was later re-arranged on Enbe Orkestrası & Behzat Gerçeker's album. In 2014, he made a duet with Ayshe for "Kim Ne Derse Desin", Turkish version of Sway. The song becomes very successful in Turkey and was nominated for a 2014 Turkey Music Awards in best debut category. In 2015, he released his second single "Sevemez Kimse Seni", a cover song of Suat Sayın previously sung by Zeki Müren and Muazzez Ersoy. The music video was released on 25 May 2015, directed by Hasan Kuyucu. The video is set in Santorini.

Acting career 
In 2015, he started acting in İnadına Aşk (tr), a TV series on FOX.

Discography

Studio albums 
 Gönül Yarası (Raks Müzik, 1997)
 Kolay Değil (Universal, 1999)
 Ne Desem Olmuyor (Ozan Video, 2003)
 Çekip Gittin (Özden Müzik, 2004)
 Zır Deli (Seyhan Müzik, 2005)
 Dönme Dolap (Seyhan Müzik, 2007)
 İki Kelime (Seyhan Müzik, 2009)
 Bilmezsin (Taş Plak, 2013)

EPs 
 İki Yasak (DMC, 2014)
 Bundan Sonra (Taş Plak, 2019)
 Cemiyet Gazinosu (Sony, 2022)
 Yaz 35°C (Sony, 2022)

Singles 
 "Kim Ne Derse Desin" - Ayshe ft. Cem Belevi (DMC, 2014)
 "Sevemez Kimse Seni" (DMC, 2015)
 "Sor" (DMC, 2015)
 "Hayat Belirtisi" (DMC, 2015)
 "Alışamıyorum" (Ozinga, 2016)
 "Aç Kollarını" (Ozinga, 2017)
 "Dumanlı Sevda" (Ozinga, 2017)
 "Yedi Düvel" (DMC, 2018)
 "Mışıl Mışıl" (DMC, 2018)
 "Farkında mısın?" (Taş Plak, 2019)
 "Kaç Kere Sever İnsan" (Taş Plak, 2020)
 "Adaleti Yok" - ft. Tetik (Taş Plak, 2020)
 "Leyla & Mecnun" - ft. Derya Uluğ (Sony, 2020)
 "Bilmez" (Sony, 2021)
 "Melekti Sanki" (Sony, 2021)
 "Olaysız Dağılmayalım" (Benden Ne Olur soundtrack) (Sony, 2021)
 "Ondan Vazgeçemem Ben" (Sony, 2022)
 "Gizli" (Sony, 2022)
 "Bilmez (Acoustic)" (Sony, 2022)
 "Belki" - ft. İrem Derici (Sony, 2022)
 "Baş Tacım" (Sony, 2022)
 "Esiyor" (Sony, 2022)
 "Allah Biliyor" (Sony, 2022)

Other appearances 
 "Günaydın Sevgilim" from Enbe Orkestrası & Behzat Gerçeker (DMC, 2015)
 "Yollarım Olsa" - Enbe Orkestrası feat. Cem Belevi, from İnadına Aşk

Music videos

Filmography

TV series 
 2015–2016 - İnadına Aşk
 2016 - Rengarenk
 2017 - Kalk Gidelim
 2021 - Menajerimi Ara
 2022 - Aşk Mantık İntikam

Film 
 2016 - Yıldızlar Da Kayar - Das Borak
 2022 - Benden Ne Olur? - Efe

References

External links 
 
 Cem Belevi on Spotify
 
 

Articles with hCards
Alumni of Brunel University London
1987 births
Turkish pop singers
21st-century Turkish male actors
Living people
21st-century Turkish singers
21st-century Turkish male singers